Jeffery Michael Singer (born September 13, 1993) is an American professional baseball pitcher for the Kansas City Monarchs of the American Association of Professional Baseball. He is currently a phantom ballplayer, having spent a day on the active roster of the Philadelphia Phillies without making an appearance.

Career

Camden Riversharks
After going undrafted in the 2015 Major League Baseball draft, Singer signed with the Camden Riversharks of the Atlantic League of Professional Baseball. In 13 appearances for Camden, Singer posted a 5.26 ERA with 30 strikeouts in 49.2 innings pitched.

Philadelphia Phillies
On October 15, 2015, Singer signed a minor league contract with the Philadelphia Phillies organization. Singer split his first season with the Phillies between three affiliates: the Low-A Williamsport Crosscutters, the Single-A Lakewood BlueClaws, and the High-A Clearwater Threshers. In 23 appearances between the three teams, Singer registered a stellar 1.79 ERA with 46 strikeouts in 40.1 cumulative innings. In 2017, Singer split the year between Clearwater and the Double-A Reading Fightin Phils, logging a 3.00 ERA with 78 strikeouts in 63.0 innings pitched across 49 contests. Singer split the 2018 season between Clearwater, Reading, and the Triple-A Lehigh Valley IronPigs. Singer pitched to a cumulative 4.22 ERA with 55 strikeouts in 44 appearances between the three affiliates.

In 2019, Singer spent the season with Double-A Reading, working to a 2.34 ERA with 74 strikeouts in 42 total appearances. Singer did not play in a game in 2020 due to the cancellation of the minor league season because of the COVID-19 pandemic. In 2021, he returned to Triple-A Lehigh Valley, posting a 4.75 ERA with 67 strikeouts in 53.0 innings of work across 44 games for the team. He was assigned to Lehigh Valley to begin the 2022 season.

On April 12, 2022, Singer was selected to the 40-man roster and promoted to the major leagues for the first time after Corey Knebel was placed on the COVID list. Singer did not make an appearance in the Phillies' game against the New York Mets and was designated for assignment the following day after Knebel was reinstated from the COVID list. His time spent on the active roster without appearing in a major league game made him a phantom ballplayer. On April 15, Singer was sent outright to Triple-A Lehigh Valley. Singer appeared in 25 games for Triple-A Lehigh, but struggled to a 2-2 record and 7.04 ERA with 29 strikeouts in 30.2 innings pitched. He was released by the organization on July 24, 2022.

Kansas City Monarchs
On March 8, 2023, Singer signed with the Kansas City Monarchs of the American Association of Professional Baseball.

References

External links

1993 births
Living people
Baseball players from Philadelphia
Williamsport Crosscutters players
Lakewood BlueClaws players
Clearwater Threshers players
Reading Fightin Phils players
Lehigh Valley IronPigs players
Monmouth Hawks baseball players
Rutgers University–Camden alumni
Camden Riversharks players
Scottsdale Scorpions players
Gigantes del Cibao players
Cangrejeros de Santurce (baseball) players
Naranjeros de Hermosillo players
Sultanes de Monterrey players